Alegria (Portuguese, Catalan) or Alegría (Spanish) or Allegria (Italian), means joy in English. It also may refer to:

Places
Alegria, Cebu, a municipality in the Philippines
Alegria, Rio Grande do Sul, a city in Brazil
Alegria, Surigao del Norte, a municipality in the Philippines
Alegría, Usulután, a municipality in El Salvador
Alegría-Dulantzi, a municipality in the province of Álava, northern Spain

People
 Alegría (surname), a Spanish surname

Books
L'allegria, 1931 collection of poetry by Ungaretti

Film and shows
 Alegría (Cirque du Soleil), a Cirque du Soleil touring show
Alegría (1999 film), a film adaptation of the Cirque du Soleil show
Alegría (2021 film), a Spanish film directed by Violeta Salama

:it:Allegria!, Italian quiz show 1999-2001 hosted by Mike Bongiorno

Music
 Alegrías, one of the many palos or subgenres of flamenco music

Albums
 Alegría (Marcos Witt album), 2006
 Alegría (Wayne Shorter album), 2003
Allegria, a 1982 album by the Gipsy Kings
Allegria (1990 album), a 1990 album by the Gipsy Kings

Songs
 "Alegria, Alegria", a 1967 Português song written and performed by Caetano Veloso
"Alegría" (song), a song from the show
 "Allegria" (it), 1968 Italian-language song by Mina (Italian singer)
"Allegria", Italian-language song by Gypsy Kings on the album Allegria

Other uses
 Alegría (Mexican candy), a snack food
 Alegria style, a geometric art style

See also 
 Algeria